Clare McCann  is an Australian actress, writer, director, singer, dancer and costume designer.

Career
She rose to national fame in 2007 on Foxtel's Channel V as Cherry for the TV series Blog Party and was a dancer and member of the Parramatta Eels cheer squad. Clare is also known for leading the Save The Roxy Theatre campaign which led to a promise of protection for the theatre at the famous Roxy Theatre in Parramatta.

Clare McCann was given a scholarship to train at the prestigious ATYP and began performing in local community theatre productions.
McCann then began writing and directing plays for her local theatre company. Her first play, Superheroes R Us was labeled by the local press as being so popular that it had standing room only. The following year McCann wrote and directed another popular play Fairyland. 
McCann then left Channel V and the cheersquad and landed the role of Mimi in the musical RENT

In 2012 McCann became the Creative Director for Marquee at the Star Casino. There she managed dance shows working with artists like Paris Hilton, Will.i.am of Black Eyed Peas and LMFAO Redfoo.
In 2015 Clare was voted by Star Central Magazine as the Most Promising Actress for her upcoming leading roles as Jane in Anthony Brown's production of Jane Eyre and as Janet Weiss in Craig Henry's 40th Anniversary Rocky Horror Show Australian tour.
In 2016 Clare won an international screenplay writers award for Benefited, her directorial debut feature film which brings awareness to domestic violence and the lack of housing support available for women and children escaping these situations. Benefited is set for release in 2020.

References

External links
 
 

21st-century Australian actresses
Australian women writers
Australian writers
Australian film directors
Australian women film directors
Living people
1980s births